Conostylis albescens is a rhizomatous, tufted perennial plant species in the family Haemodoraceae, endemic to the south-west of Western Australia. Plants grow to between 12 and 17 cm high and produce yellow-cream-white flowers in August in the species' native range.  The grey-green, hairy, leaves are 12–17 cm long and  0.8–1.5 mm wide.

It is found east of Merredin, Western Australia, on yellow sandplain in a small region of heath.

It was first described in 1987 by Stephen Hopper as  Conostylis albescens.

References

Commelinales of Australia
Angiosperms of Western Australia
Plants described in 1987
Taxa named by Stephen Hopper
albescens